Conocephalus gracillimus, the graceful meadow katydid, is a species of meadow katydid in the family Tettigoniidae. It is found in North America.

References

gracillimus
Articles created by Qbugbot
Insects described in 1891